The James White Award is an annual short story competition open to writers from around the world. It was established in 2000 to commemorate the life and work of the Irish science fiction author James White.

The competition was created to encourage new writers and is not open to professional authors. "Professional author" is defined as one who is eligible for active membership of the Science Fiction Writers of America – that is, a writer with three short story sales to qualifying markets or one novel sale to a qualifying market. Entries must be 6,000 words or less and written in English.

The winning story receives a cash prize and publication in Interzone magazine.

The award is sponsored by Interzone and the British Science Fiction Association, which took over the administration of the award in 2010.

Award history
The winners and judges of the award, from 2001 until 2019. Bold is winner, others are shortlisted entries.

2001
Mark Dunn, Think Tank
Mrs Isobel Hanson, Word – Perfect
Yvonne Coats, The Resurgence of Gloves
Derek Paterson, Zenith
Michael Green, The Night Before Opening (special commendation)

Judging panel: Morgan Llywelyn, Dave Langford, Michael Scott, David Pringle and Michael Carroll.
The award ceremony took place at the Dublin Writers’ Museum.

2002
David D. Levine, Nucleon
Janet Barron, Extemophenia
Lannah Battley, Fear of the alien
Ciaran Conliffe, The Last Whippoorwill
Jetse de Vries, Rainmaker on the run

Judging panel: Ian McDonald, Mike Resnick, Kim Newman, Michael Carroll and David Pringle.
The award ceremony took place in Queen's University Belfast. 

2003
Julian West, Vita Brevis Ars Longa
Jon Matthais, To Protect and to Swerve
Seamus Sweeney, The Unimortal
Damian Cox, A Metamorphosis
Jason Woodward, Outside the Encryption Zone

Judging  panel drawn from the science fiction field in the USA and Europe: Michael Carroll, David Pringle, Orson Scott Card, Christopher Fowler and Graham Joyce.
The award was presented at a ceremony at the Quality Inn in Walsall immediately following the Novacon 32 Science Fiction Convention. 

2004
Dierdre Ruane, Lost Things Saved in Boxes(no shortlist)

Judging panel drawn from the science fiction field in the USA and Europe: Lois McMaster Bujold, Michael Carroll, Peter F. Hamilton, Christopher Priest and David Pringle.
The award was presented at a ceremony at Winter Gardens, in Blackpool, on Sunday 11 April 2004. This was the venue for Concourse, the National British Convention, also known as Eastercon. 

2005Elizebeth Hopkinson, A Short History of the Dream LibraryDave Gullen, Everything is Easy NowEve Power, Harmemoric AsylumGary Spencer, Heartbroken ThingsGraham Bensley, Following the KhiseriansJudging panel: Andy Cox, Jasper Fforde, Michael Carroll, Teresa Nielsen Hayden and the late Robert Sheckley.
The award was presented at Interaction, The World Science Fiction Convention 2005, during the Hugo Award ceremony in the Scottish Exhibition Centre  on Sunday 7 August 2005. 

2006
Jennifer Harwood-Smith, The Faces of My Friends
Simon Cooper, Happiness Worms On Xam???Alan Heal, HitchhikersGary Spencer, Matthews Conundrum of InanimacyDerek Willmer, Version2Judging panel drawn from the science fiction field in Europe: Kelly Link, Alastair Reynolds, Andy Cox and Michael Carroll.
The award was presented at Octocon, the National Science Fiction Convention in Ireland on Saturday 14 October 2006.  

2007
The judges made the decision not to make an award.

2008-9
No competition.

2010
James Bloomer, Flock, Shoal, Herd
David L Clements, His Final ExperimentDan Purdue, Are Friends ElectricDavid John Baker, In Memories Not Yet MadeThe award was presented at the British Science Fiction Association AGM in June 2010 and the judges included the novelist Ian Whates and the Interzone editor Andy Cox. The winning story was printed in Interzone 232.

2011
Colum Paget, Invocation of the Lurker 
Gaea Denker-Lehrman – SolversDarren Goossens – CircleDavid McGroarty – A Traveller from an Antique LandSarah Stanton – ChrysanthemumJudging panel: the novelists Jon Courtenay Grimwood and Juliet E. McKenna, and the Interzone editor Andrew Cox.
The award was presented at Olympus 2012 on 7 April. 

2012/13
Shannon Fay, You First Meet the Devil At A Church Fête 
Philip Suggars – Automatic DiamantéJonathan Bloxsom - AcademicDan Campbell - All the DistancesDarren Goossens - Every Useless ParameterJS Richardson - The Well-DeceivedJudging panel: Hugo award winner Ian McDonald, Nebula award winner Aliette de Bodard and the Interzone editors Andrew Cox and Andrew Hedgecox.
The award was presented at EightSquaredCon (2013’s Eastercon) in Bradford. 

The winning story was published in Interzone issue 246.

A runner up prize was awarded to Philip Suggars for his story Automatic Diamanté. This story was published in Interzone issue 247.

The James White Award changed the date given to the competition in this year - future dates reflect the year the award was presented rather than the date on which the competition opened for entries.

2014
DJ Cockburn – Beside The Dammed River
Katie Lee – AppinessVina Jie-Min Prasad - Flesh and BoneCindy George – Grumpy Old ManBenjamin C. Kinney – The Demands of IronJudging panel: authors Sophia McDougall, Emma Newman and BSFA Award winner Adam Roberts.
The judges awarded a special commendation to Vina Jie-Min Prasad’s Flesh and Bone.

The award was presented at Satellite4 (the 2014 Eastercon) in Glasgow).

The winning story was published in Interzone 253 and in The Year's Best Science Fiction: Thirty-Second Annual Collection (2015) edited by Gardner Dozois.

2015
Mack Leonard – Midnight Funk Association
Patrick Martin – Ideas Machine, Suffolk StreetJedd Cole – Relics of the All-LegendJessica Lilien – The Simple 12-Step Solution to the 3×3 Hypercube in Minkowski Spacetime Winnie M Li – White FurJudging panel:f the authors Dave Hutchinson, Stephanie Saulter and Gareth L Powell.
The award was presented at Dysprosium (the 2015 Eastercon) in London). 

2016
David Cleden - Rock, Paper, Incisors
Trina Marie Phillips - Deadly DanceJason Kimble - If Only Kissing Made It SoMorgan Parks - Let The Bells Ring OutMatt Dovey - (Perhaps The Answer Is) That We Question At AllJon Lasser - WreckwalkersJudging panel: the authors Neil Williamson, RJ Booth and Ian Sales.
The award was presented at the 2016 Eastercon (Mancunicon) in Manchester. 

2017
Stuart Horn - The Morrigan
Steve Dubois - DonBeth Plutchak - Skin and BoneElsie WK Donald - The CutCameron Johnston - The Dying GlassJudging panel: Lorna Gibbs, David Gullen and Konrad Walewski.
The judges also awarded a special commendation to May the Pain Guide You Home by Daniel Roy.

2018
Dustin Blair Steinacker - Two Worlds Apart
Matthew Eeles - ImagoSarah Pauling - Ms. Höffern Stays Abreast of the NewsSarah Palmer - My FaultE.M Faulds - The Big I AmJudging panel: Anne Charnock, RJ Barker and Una McCormack.
The judges also awarded a special commendation to A Sip of Pombé by Gustavo Bondoni.

2019
David Maskill - Limitations
Bryn Fazakerley - Better Lost Than LovedMica Scotti Kole - Bug on BugKoji A Dae - Digital NomadStephen Cashmore - The Last Words of Harry NiffenJudging panel: Justina Robson, Chris Beckett, and Donna Scott.
The judges also awarded a special commendation to runner up Property Crime by Michael Donoghue – who missed out by the narrowest margin in the award's history.

References

External links
The James White Award, official website 
The British Science Fiction Association
TTA Press, publisher of Interzone''

British speculative fiction awards
Short story awards
Literary awards by magazines and newspapers
Awards established in 2001
2001 establishments in the United Kingdom